This is a list of special elections to the Minnesota House of Representatives. Such elections are called by the governor of Minnesota to fill vacancies that occur when a member of the Minnesota House of Representatives dies or resigns before the biennial general election. Winners of these elections serve the remainder of the term and are usually candidates in the next election for their districts.

General elections are held in November of even numbered years. New Legislatures convene on the first Tuesday following the first Monday of the following year.

List of special elections

See also
 List of special elections to the Minnesota Senate

References

External links
 Results of Special Elections for the Minnesota Legislature, 1971-present Minnesota Legislative Reference Library

Minnesota House of Representatives special elections
Minnesota House special elections